Vice Admiral Martyn Trainor  (born 13 January 1944) is a retired South African Navy Officer, who served as Chief of Corporate Staff of the South African National Defence Force.

Naval career
He matriculated from Diocesan College and joined the Navy in 1962 and attended the South African Military Academy, graduating in 1965.
He served on Frigates and Minesweepers before volunteering for the Submarine service.

He commanded Naval Base Durban and the Naval Staff College. He was promoted to Commodore in 1989 and appointed Chief of Naval Staff Personnel. On 1 September 1992 he was promoted to rear admiral and appointed Chief of Naval Staff and Chief of Naval Support. and Chief of Fleet Staff Personnel.

He was appointed Chief of Corporate Staff on 1 November 2000 and promoted to vice admiral. He retired from the Navy in 2004.

References

1944 births
Living people
South African admirals
Submariners
Alumni of Diocesan College, Cape Town